Brooks Creek is a stream in the U.S. state of Indiana. It is a tributary to the Salamonie River.

Brooks Creek was named after John Brooks, a pioneer settler.

References

Rivers of Indiana
Rivers of Jay County, Indiana
Tributaries of the Wabash River